The Pennsylvania Open Championship is the Pennsylvania state open golf tournament, open to both amateur and professional golfers. It is organized by the Pennsylvania Golf Association. It has been played annually since 1912 (except for war years) at a variety of courses around the state. It was considered a PGA Tour event in some years during the 1920s and 1930s.

Winners

2022 Jake Sollon
2021 Alex Blickle
2020 Jimmy Ellis (a)
2019 Isaiah Logue
2018 Kevin Kraft
2017 Greg Jarmas
2016 Robert Rohanna
2015 Billy Stewart
2014 John Pillar, Sr.
2013 Andrew Mason
2012 Clayton Rotz
2011 Mark Sheftic
2010 Robert Rohanna
2009 Justin Smith
2008 Mike Van Sickle (a)
2007 Mike Van Sickle (a)
2006 Kyle Davis
2005 Sean Farren
2004 Ryan Sikora
2003 Steve Wheatcroft
2002 Terry Hertzog
2001 Jeff Daniels
2000 Terry Hertzog
1999 Terry Hatch
1998 Stuart Ingraham
1997 Gene Fieger
1996 John Mazza
1995 Gene Fieger
1994 Paul Oglesby
1993 Bob Ford
1992 Mike Moses
1991 Frank Dobbs
1990 Jay Sigel (a)
1989 Joseph J. Boros
1988 Gene Fieger
1987 Brian Kelly
1986 Frank Fuhrer, III
1985 Don De Angelis
1984 Roy Vucinich
1983 Jay Sigel (a)
1982 Lee Raymond (a)
1981 Bob Ford
1980 Bob Huber
1979 Ron Milanovich
1978 Jay Sigel (a)
1977 Bob Ford
1976 Jeff Steinberg
1975 Steve Brewton (a)
1974 Jay Sigel (a)
1973 Tony Perla
1972 Andy Thompson
1971 Jack Kiefer
1970 James Masserio (a)
1969 Tony Perla
1968 Ronald Stafford
1967 Robert Ross
1966 Richard Bassett
1965 Bob Shave
1964 Jerry Pisano
1963 Bert Yancey
1962 Henry Williams, Jr.
1961 Al Besselink
1960 John Guenther, Jr. (a)
1959 Skee Riegel
1958 Dick Sleichter
1957 Skee Riegel
1956 Johnny Weitzel
1955 Johnny Weitzel
1954 Henry Williams, Jr.
1953 Bo Wininger
1952 George Griffin, Jr.
1951 Johnny Bulla
1950 Jerry Barber
1949 Andy Gasper
1948 Terl Johnson
1947 Steve Kovach
1946 Steve Kovach
1943–1945 No tournament
1942 Sam Byrd
1941 Gene Kunes
1940 Sam Parks, Jr.
1939 Ray Mangrum
1938 Lloyd Mangrum
1937 Toney Penna
1936 Felix Serafin
1935 Ray Mangrum
1934 Willie Macfarlane
1933 Dick Metz
1932 Vincent Eldred
1931 Felix Serafin
1930 Ed Dudley
1929 Ed Dudley
1928 Tommy Armour
1927 Johnny Farrell
1926 John Rogers
1925 Joe Turnesa
1924 Emmet French
1923 James Edmundson
1922 Emil Loeffler
1921 Cyril Walker
1920 Emil Loeffler
1919 Charles Hoffner
1917–1918 No tournament
1916 Jock Hutchison
1915 Tom Anderson, Jr.
1914 Macdonald Smith
1913 James Thompson
1912 Tom Anderson, Jr.

(a) denotes amateur

References

External links
Pennsylvania Golf Association
List of winners

Former PGA Tour events
Golf in Pennsylvania
State Open golf tournaments